Jennings is a town in Hamilton County, Florida, United States. The population was 878 at the 2010 census, up from 833 at the 2000 census.

Geography
Jennings is located in northwestern Hamilton County at  (30.6041015, -83.0979184). U.S. Route 41 passes through the town as Plum Street, leading southeast  to Jasper, the county seat, and northwest  to Lake Park, Georgia. Interstate 75 runs along the southwest border of the town, with access from Exit 467 (Hamilton Avenue). I-75 leads southeast  to Interstate 10 near Lake City, Florida, and northwest  to Valdosta, Georgia.

Demographics

As of the census of 2000, there were 833 people, 282 households, and 205 families residing in the town.  The population density was 461.3 people per square mile (177.7/km²).  There were 321 housing units at an average density of 177.8 per square mile (68.5/km²).  The racial makeup of the town was 43.70% White, 43.10% African American, 0.60% Native American, 0.60% Asian, 10.08% from other races, and 1.92% from two or more races. Hispanic or Latino of any race were 22.69% of the population.

There were 282 households out of which 33.3% had children under the age of 18 living with them, 44.7% were married couples living together, 20.2% had a female householder with no husband present, and 27.3% were non-families. 23.0% of all households were made up of individuals and 11.7% had someone living alone who was 65 years of age or older.  The average household size was 2.89 and the average family size was 3.34.

In the town, the population was spread out with 30.6% under the age of 18, 9.0% from 18 to 24, 25.7% from 25 to 44, 22.4% from 45 to 64, and 12.2% who were 65 years of age or older.  The median age was 32 years. For every 100 females, there were 98.8 males.  For every 100 females age 18 and over, there were 99.3 males.

The median income for a household in the town was $25,714, and the median income for a family was $25,938. Males had a median income of $25,577 versus $15,982 for females. The per capita income for the town was $12,195.  About 23.8% of families and 30.8% of the population were below the poverty line, including 42.9% of those under age 18 and 20.0% of those age 65 or over.

Education

The Hamilton County School District operates the public schools serving Jennings, Hamilton County Elementary School  and Hamilton County High School in an unincorporated area of the county. Until August 2017 North Hamilton Elementary School in Jennings served the community.

North Hamilton Elementary was consolidated into a new elementary school, Hamilton County Elementary School, located in an unincorporated area south of Jasper. Its opening was scheduled for August 2017.

The Suwannee River Regional Library System operates the Jennings Public Library.

References

External links
 
 Origin of the name

Towns in Hamilton County, Florida
Towns in Florida